The OED is the Oxford English Dictionary, English's principal historical dictionary.

OED or oed may also refer to:

Places in Austria 
 Oed-Öhling, a town in Amstetten District
 Oed, various hamlets in Melk District

Other uses 
 Online Etymology Dictionary, a website giving English word origins
 Orion Air Charter (ICAO airline code: OED)